Alberta is a monotypic genus of flowering plants in the family Rubiaceae. Most species have been transferred to the genus Razafimandimbisonia, except for the type species Alberta magna. It is native to KwaZulu-Natal, South Africa and is commonly known as Natal flame bush.

Taxonomy
The genus Alberta was shown to be paraphyletic in a phylogenetic analysis of the tribe Alberteae. The type species Alberta magna is set apart from the Malagasy Alberta species that are now included in the genus Razafimandimbisonia.

References

External links
Alberta in the World Checklist of Rubiaceae

Alberteae
Flora of South Africa
Plants described in 1838
Taxonomy articles created by Polbot